The 1930–31 City Cup was the thirty-third edition of the City Cup, a cup competition in Northern Irish football.

The tournament was won by Belfast Celtic for the 6th time and 2nd consecutive year.

Group standings

References

1930–31 in Northern Ireland association football